Martin Erich Philipp (1887 in Zwickau – 1978 in Dresden) was an influential German Jewish artist.

References

1887 births
1978 deaths
People from Zwickau
20th-century German artists
19th-century German Jews